The 45th Massachusetts General Court, consisting of the Massachusetts Senate and the Massachusetts House of Representatives, met in 1824 and 1825 during the governorship of William Eustis. Nathaniel Silsbee served as president of the Senate and William C. Jarvis served as speaker of the House.

Senators

Representatives

See also
 18th United States Congress
 List of Massachusetts General Courts

References

External links
 . (Includes data for state senate and house elections in 1824)
 
 
 
 

Political history of Massachusetts
Massachusetts legislative sessions
massachusetts
1824 in Massachusetts
massachusetts
1825 in Massachusetts